The Moore–Youse–Maxon House, also known as the Moore–Youse Home Museum, is a historic home located at Muncie, Delaware County, Indiana. It was built about 1860, and is a two-story, three bay, vernacular Greek Revival style frame dwelling.  It features a rebuilt front porch with sawnwork and brackets. It has a two-story rear addition.  The house remained in the same family from 1864 to 1982.  The building is operated by the Delaware County Historical Society as a historic house museum.

It was added to the National Register of Historic Places in 1984.  It is located in the Walnut Street Historic District.

References

External links
Delaware County Historical Society website

Historic house museums in Indiana
Houses on the National Register of Historic Places in Indiana
Greek Revival houses in Indiana
Houses completed in 1860
Museums in Delaware County, Indiana
National Register of Historic Places in Muncie, Indiana
Houses in Muncie, Indiana
Tourist attractions in Muncie, Indiana
Historic district contributing properties in Indiana